Michel Bernholc (1941–2002) was a French composer, arranger and producer. Using the pseudonym Mike Steïphenson, he wrote and produced the 1971 hit "Burundi Black", which made #31 on the UK Singles Chart and #74 in Australia.

He also wrote the Victoire Scott song "La Licorne D’or", which was covered by the Swedish symphonic metal band Therion on their fifteenth full-length musical album Les Fleurs du Mal.

References

External links
 Obituary (in French)

French composers
French male composers
1941 births
2002 suicides
Suicides in France
20th-century French musicians
20th-century French male musicians
Eurovision Song Contest conductors